Alcis rubicunda is a moth of the  family Geometridae. It is found in Taiwan.

The wingspan is 32–40 mm.

References

Moths described in 1909
Boarmiini
Moths of Taiwan